Tamil Nadu Congress Committee (TNCC) is the wing of Indian National Congress serving in Tamil Nadu. The current president is K.S. Alagari.

Social policy of the TNCC is officially based upon the Gandhian principle of Sarvodaya (upliftment of all sections of the society). In particular TNCC emphasises upon policies to improve the lives of the economically underprivileged and socially unprivileged sections of society. The party primarily endorses social liberalism (seeks to balance individual liberty and social justice).

Ideology and policy positions
Since the 1950s, the TNCC has favored liberal positions (the term "liberal" in this sense describes modern liberalism, not classical liberalism) with support for social justice and a mixed economy. TNCC strongly supports Liberal nationalism, a kind of nationalism compatible with values of freedom, tolerance, equality, and individual rights.

Historically, the party has favoured farmers, labourers, and the working upper class; it has opposed unregulated business and finance. In recent decades, the party has adopted a centrist economic and socially progressive agenda and has begun to advocate for more social justice, affirmative action, a balanced budget, and a market economy.  The economic policy adopted by the modern TNCC is free market policies, though at the same time it is in favour of taking a cautious approach when it comes to liberalising the economy claiming it is to help ensure that the weaker sectors are not affected too hard by the changes that come with liberalisation. In the 1990s, however, it endorsed market reforms, including privatisation and the deregulation of the economy. It also has supported secular policies that encourage equal rights for all citizens, including those from the lower stratas. The party supports the somewhat controversial concept of family planning with birth control.

Economic policy
The Congress strongly endorses a mixed Capital economy in which both the private sector and the state direct the economy, reflecting characteristics of both market economies and planned economies. A leading economic theory advocated by the modern Tamil Nadu Congress party is import substitution industrialisation that advocates replacing foreign imports with domestic production. Party also believes that mixed economies often provide environmental protection, maintenance of employment standards, a standardized welfare system, and maintenance of competition. The Indian National Congress party liberalised the Indian economy, allowing it to speed up development dramatically.

Healthcare and education
Tamil Nadu Congress Pioneered the first Midday Meal Scheme in India in the Year 1953. This led to a huge wave of enrollment by students from the predominant rural and semi urban pockets of Tamil Nadu, which helped increase the Literacy rate of the state from 16% in 1947 to 82% in 2011. Today, it has become the largest schoolchild feeding programme in the world, covering 110 million students in 1.2 million schools. This rural health initiative was praised by the American economist Jeffrey Sachs and former American President John F. Kennedy. During the TNCC tenure, an IIT and was opened in the state.

Security and State Affairs
The Tamil Nadu Congress party has been instrumental in debating and helping strengthen anti-terror and vigilant laws leading to amendments to the Security Laws of the Tamil Nadu Government Departments. Also, Unique Identification Authority of India was established in February 2009, with the help of the Central Government, an agency responsible for implementing the envisioned Multipurpose National Identity Card with the objective of increasing national security and facilitating e-governance.

State Office bearers

AICC

TNCC

List of president of TNCC

List of Chief Ministers of Tamil Nadu from the Congress Party

Madras Presidency

Madras State

Tamil Nadu Legislative Assembly Election

• Madras State was completely reorganized into the present state of Tamil Nadu in the year 1956. But the name was changed to Tamil Nadu only in the year 1969

See also
 Congress Working Committee
 All India Congress Committee
 Pradesh Congress Committee

References

External links
INC Tamil Nadu website

Indian National Congress of Tamil Nadu